Jacqueline Robinson (30 January 1966 – 9 October 2005) was a Jamaican cricketer who played as an all-rounder, batting right-handed and bowling right-arm medium-fast. She appeared in one Test match and 16 One Day Internationals the West Indies, appearing in 7 ODIs at the 1993 World Cup before playing the rest of her international matches in 2004, on a tour of India and Pakistan. She played domestic cricket for Jamaica.

References

External links
 
 

1966 births
2005 deaths
Jamaican women cricketers
West Indian women cricketers
West Indies women Test cricketers
West Indies women One Day International cricketers